The Central District of Semirom County is a district (bakhsh) in Semirom County, Isfahan Province, Iran. At the 2006 census, its population was 47,535, in 11,653 families.  The District has three cities: Semirom, Vanak, and Hana. The District has three rural districts (dehestan): Hana Rural District, Vanak Rural District, and Vardasht Rural District.

References 

Semirom County
Districts of Isfahan Province